Ben H. Lewis (November 27, 1902 – June 20, 1985) was an American politician, artist, and businessman who served as the 13th mayor of Riverside, California. Prior to the office of mayor, Lewis was the president of the United Title Guaranty Company, later known as the Land Title Company, of Riverside. The main hall at the Riverside Convention Center is named in his honor, as well as a bridge on Mount Rubidoux.

Early life
Lewis was the son of D. W. Lewis and Edith Binks. His father organized several land title insurance companies in Riverside, Orange, and Imperial Counties. Later, Lewis became the president and owner of the Riverside-based Land Title Company.

Career 
After attending high school in Riverside, Lewis attended the Otis College of Art and Design in Los Angeles. He subsequently became a commercial artist, made animated cartoons, and contracted with Universal Studios, where he appeared in several films. Upon returning to Riverside, Lewis began his career in the land title industry. He was also active in many community and fraternal organizations, as well as president of the Riverside Community Players, a local theatrical group.

See also
List of mayors of Riverside, California

References

Bibliography
 Paul, Arthur G. Riverside Community Book, A. H. Cawston, Riverside, California, 1954.

External links
 The Political Graveyard; Mayors of Riverside, California. Retrieved 2010-11-07.
 

1902 births
1985 deaths
Burials in Riverside County, California
Mayors of Riverside, California
20th-century American politicians